Strachotín is a municipality and village in Břeclav District in the South Moravian Region of the Czech Republic. It has about 800 inhabitants.

Geography
It lies in the northwestern tip of the Lower Morava Valley. It it situated on the shores of the Nové Mlýny Reservoir and Strachotínský Pond.

History
The first written mention of Strachotín is from 1046. In 1334, it was promoted to a market town. During the Thirty Years' War, Strachotín was completely burned down. After the World War II, the municipality lost its market town title.

References

Villages in Břeclav District